The Kingdom of Baol or Bawol in central Senegal was one of the kingdoms that arose from the split-up of the Empire of Jolof (Diolof) in 1555.  The ruler (Teigne or Teen) reigned from a capital in Diourbel.

The Kingdom encompassed a strip of land extending east from the ocean to the capital city and included the towns of Touba and MBacke.  It was directly south of the Kingdom of Cayor and north of the Kingdom of Sine. 

Baol was famous for its horses. It has unique breeds, which were faster and more robust than most of the horses on the plain. Baol citizens are good riders.

Baol became a Wolof kingdom, but it included communities of Serer-Safen and other Serer groups.
  
Before the Faal (or Fall) family came into power, Baol was ruled by a mixed dynasty: the Wagadu maternal dynasty (from the Ghana Empire along with the Serer paternal dynasties of N'Gom (or Ngum), Thiaw, and Joof or Diouf (along with Faye), all three major Serer patriclans represented during the Faal dynastic period. Some of the earlier Serer kings (teeň or teigne) before the Faal paternal dynasty included: Kolki Faye; Mbissine Ndoumbé Ngom; Massamba Fambi Ngom; Fambi Langar Ngom; Patar Xole Joof (or Maad Patar Kolleh Joof, the Great) - grandson of Maad Ndaah Njemeh Joof; and Maguinak Joof, cousin of Amari Ngoneh Sobel Faal who accompanied him at the Battle of Danki (1549) and helped him defeat the Emperor of Jolof, thereby bringing his empire too its knees.

Amari Ngoneh Sobel Faal, the first Damel-Teign from the Faal family, is the maternal grandson of Lingeer Sobel Joof, mother of Lingeer Ngoneh Sobel Njie (French: Ngonē Sobel Ndiaye) - Amari Ngoneh's own mother. Sobel Joof was a descendant of Maad Ndaah Njemeh Joof, the medieval king of Laah, Baol. The Faal family that later ruled Cayor and Baol traced descent to the Joof family. They simply married into the much older royal dynasty. 

The social and political systems were basically the same as those of Cayor.  In fact, the kingdoms merged from time to time for mutual defense.

The French conquest of Baol began in 1859.  Most of Baol was conquered by the French in 1874, however complete control of the former kingdom was not gained by France until 1895.  It was one of many campaigns of Governor Louis Faidherbe who oversaw the conquest of Cayor in 1886.

List of kings
Names and dates taken from John Stewart's African States and Rulers:

 Niokhor (c. 1550–c. 1560)
 Amari (c. 1560–1593)
 Mamalik Thioro (1593–?)
 Tié N'Della (?)
 Tié Kura (?)
 M'Bissan Kura (?)
 Tiande (?–c. 1664)
 M'Bar (c. 1664–c. 1690)
 Tié Yaasin Demba (c. 1690–c. 1693)
 Tié Tieumbeul (c. 1693–1697)
 Lat Sukaabe (1697–1719)
 Mali Kumba Dyaring (1719)
 Ma-Kodu Kumba (1719–1749)
 Mawa (1749–c. 1752)
 M'Bissan N'Della (c. 1752–c. 1758)
 Ma-Kodu Kumba (c. 1758–1777)

Position vacant from 1777 to 1809

 Tié-Yaasin Dieng (1809–1815)
 Amadi Dyor (1815–c. 1822)
 Birayma Fatma (c. 1822–1832)
 Isa Tein-Dyor (1832–1855)
 Tié-Yaasin N'Gone (1855–c. 1857)
 Ma-Kodu Kodu Kumba (c. 1857–1859)
 Mali Kumba N'Gone (1859–1862)
 Tié-Yaasin Gallo (1862–1890)
 Tanor Gogne (1890–3 July 1894)

See also
Joof family
Faye family

Sources

http://www.worldstatesmen.org/Senegal_native.html
Clark, Andrew F. and Lucie Colvin Phillips, Historical Dictionary of Senegal, Second Edition Published as No. 65 of African Historical Dictionaries, (Metuchen, New Jersey: The Scarecrow Press, 1994) p. 74-75

History of Senegal
Kingdoms of Senegal
French West Africa
Former countries in Africa
Former monarchies of Africa
Countries in precolonial Africa
States and territories established in 1555
States and territories disestablished in 1895
Sahelian kingdoms
1555 establishments in Africa
Serer country
Serer history
Serer precolonial kingdoms
Lists of African monarchs